Dactyloceras ostentator is a moth in the  family Brahmaeidae. It was described by Hering in 1927. It is found in Cameroon.

References

Natural History Museum Lepidoptera generic names catalog

Endemic fauna of Cameroon
Brahmaeidae
Moths described in 1927